Simpelveld is a municipality and a town in the southeastern Netherlands. It is part of the municipal cooperative unit Parkstad Limburg. 

Simpelveld is part of the Mergelland, named after the presence of chalk (mergel), hill country popular with tourists. The Mergellandroute passes through the town. 

The population centre of Simpelveld has 28 national monuments, amongst which are the Oude Molen and the Saint Remigius Church. Simpelveld has a heritage railway station and is the home base of the South Limburg Railway Company. On one weekend in October there is a Day out with Thomas from the children's television series Thomas and Friends.

Population centres 
Bocholtz
Simpelveld

Besides these official centres there are other hamlets which fall under the municipality:

Religion
The municipality has two churches within its borders:

James the Greater Church in Bocholtz
Saint Remigius Church in Simpelveld

The city also has two monasteries, these are 
 the Loreto monastery and 
 Huize Damiaan, which has been home to The International Butler Academy since 2015.

Regional language 
Simpelveld is part of The Netherlands and therefore the official language is Dutch. A lot of people also speak Simpelvelds, a regional language that depending on the definition belongs to Ripuarian or Limburgish. It is also referred to as Southeast Limburgish.

Notable people 
 Step Vaessen (born 1965) a Dutch broadcast journalist, currently working as a Moscow correspondent for Al Jazeera English
 Ralph Hamers (born 1966) a Dutch businessman, the chief executive officer (CEO) of UBS Group
 Jolanda Jetten (born 1970, Simpelveld) a Dutch social psychologist and academic

See also 
List of mayors of Simpelveld

Gallery

References

External links

 
Municipalities of Limburg (Netherlands)
Populated places in Limburg (Netherlands)
South Limburg (Netherlands)